The Triple Crown of Open Water Swimming is a marathon swimming challenge consisting of three historically important swims:

The English Channel, 33 km between France and England
The Catalina Channel, 32.5 km between Catalina Island and the California mainland
Manhattan Island Marathon Swim, a 48.5 km circumnavigation of Manhattan Island, New York City.

As of August 2022, 269 swimmers had earned this distinction.

Double Triple Crown 
Swimmers who have completed two swims each of the English Channel, Catalina, and Manhattan are said to have achieved the Double Triple Crown. The Mexican Antonio Argüelles was the first swimmer to achieve this, his first Triple Crown in 1999 and the second in 2009.

Swimmers who have achieved the Double Triple Crown are:

References

External links 
 Channel Swimming Association
 Channel Swimming & Piloting Federation
 Catalina Channel Swimming Federation
 New York Open Water